Balitanghali is a Philippine television news broadcasting show produced by GMA Integrated News and Public Affairs. Originally anchored by Pia Arcangel and Raffy Tima, it premiered on November 11, 2005, on Q. The show was carried over on GMA News TV on February 28, 2011, and on GTV on February 22, 2021. Tima and Connie Sison currently serve as the anchors.

Overview
The show premiered on Q on November 11, 2005, from Mondays to Saturdays. On February 7, 2010, it started airing on Sundays, leading to a weekend edition. It was simulcasted on radio through DZBB-AM. In May 2008, the simulcast was limited to weekends to give way for Super Balita sa Tanghali Nationwide.

After Q ceased airing on February 20, 2011, the newscast was carried over on its replacement network, GMA News TV on February 28, 2011. On April 25, 2011, Grace Lee joined as the new host for the Star Bites. Lee left in 2012 and was replaced by Luane Dy. On November 10, 2014, Connie Sison replaced Pia Arcangel as an anchor. Dy left the show in 2017.

On August 2, 2019, Jun Veneracion left Balitanghali Weekend followed by Mariz Umali 2 days later on August 4, 2019. Veneracion and Umali were replaced by Mark Salazar and Mav Gonzales.

In March 2020, the production was temporarily halted due to the enhanced community quarantine in Luzon caused by the COVID-19 pandemic. The show resumed its programming on September 21, 2020.

In February 2021, GMA News TV was rebranded as GTV, with the show being carried over to the said network.

On September 19, 2022, Balitanghali began its simulcast on Heart of Asia Channel and I Heart Movies.

Anchors

 Raffy Tima 
 Connie Sison 

Former anchors
 Pia Arcangel 
 Jun Veneracion 
 Mariz Umali 
 Grace Lee 
 Luane Dy 
 Nelson Canlas 
 Athena Imperial 
 Cata Tibayan 
 Mark Salazar 
 Mav Gonzales

Accolades

References

External links
 
 

2005 Philippine television series debuts
Filipino-language television shows
GMA Integrated News and Public Affairs shows
GMA News TV original programming
GTV (Philippine TV network) original programming
Philippine television news shows
Q (TV network) news shows
Television productions suspended due to the COVID-19 pandemic
Sign language television shows